The Valencia Marathon (also known as Marathon Valencia Trinidad Alfonso EDP for sponsorship reasons) is an annual marathon road running event hosted by Valencia, Spain since 1981. It is categorized as a Platinum Label Road Race by World Athletics.  The race is organised by the Valencian sports club , which also organises the annual Valencia Half Marathon.

The marathon is ranked Nº1 amongst marathons in the Spanish Road Races Ranking.

History

The marathon was first held in 1981 as a popular race known as the Marató Popular de València.

From 2011 to 2014, the marathon was known as the Divina Pastora Valencia Marathon.

In 2015, the marathon was known as the Valencia Trinidad Alfonso Marathon.

On , the race organizer announced the cancellation of the 2020 in-person edition of the mass race due to the coronavirus pandemic, with all registrants given the option of running the race virtually, transferring their entry to 2021, or obtaining a full refund. Both races would use a course very similar to that used in the Valencia Half Marathon, with marathoners running two laps of the course. On the day of the race, four half marathon runners broke the previous world record of 58:01, with Kenyan Kibiwott Kandie setting a new world record of 57:32. In addition, four marathon runners broke the previous course record of 2:03:51, with Kenyan Evans Chebet setting a new course record of 2:03:00, the sixth-fastest marathon at the time, while Kenyan Peres Jepchirchir also broke the previous course record of 2:18:30 with a new course record of 2:17:16, the fifth-fastest marathon at the time.

Course

The course for the elite-only races in 2020 during the coronavirus pandemic used a modified version of the Valencia Half Marathon course, with marathon runners running two laps.

Winners

Key:
  Course record (in bold)
  National championship race

Marathon

Half marathon

The 40th edition of the marathon, held during the coronavirus pandemic, was an elite-only event that also included a half marathon race.

 Sources:
 Previous editions results
 https://arrs.run/HP_ValMa.htm

Wins by country

Notes

References

External links
Official website

Marathons in Spain
Sports competitions in Valencia
Recurring sporting events established in 1981
1981 establishments in Spain
Autumn events in Spain